Sores is a French surname. Notable people with the surname include:

 Jacques de Sores, sixteenth century French pirate
 Raoul II Sores (died 1282), marshal of France

See also
 Sore (disambiguation)

French-language surnames